Fort Hill may refer to:

Places

United States

Fort Hill, site of Fort Moore, a former landmark overlooking the Old West town of Los Angeles, California
Fort Hill (Frankfort, Kentucky), a park and historic site
Fort Hill, Boston, Massachusetts, a neighborhood and historic district
Fort Hill Estate, an historic estate in Lloyd Harbor, New York
Fort Hill State Memorial, a Native American earthwork located in Highland County, Ohio
Nelson Avenue–Fort Hill Historic District, a residential neighborhood in northwestern Peekskill, New York
Fort Hill, Oregon, an unincorporated community in Polk and Yamhill counties
Fort Hill, Pennsylvania, an unincorporated community in Somerset County
Fort Hill (Clemson, South Carolina), John C. Calhoun's house
Fort Hill, West Virginia, a community
Fort Hill (Burlington, West Virginia), a historic plantation

Other places
Chitipa, Malawi, also known as Fort Hill

Schools 
Fort Hill College, Lisburn, Northern Ireland
Fort Hill Community School, Winklebury, Basingstoke, Hampshire, UK
Fort Hill High School, Cumberland, Maryland

See also
Fort A.P. Hill
Fort Hill Historic District (disambiguation)